Quinaprilat is the active metabolite of quinapril.

References 

ACE inhibitors
Carboxamides
Pfizer brands
Tetrahydroisoquinolines